The 55th Academy Awards were presented April 11, 1983, at the Dorothy Chandler Pavilion, Los Angeles. The ceremonies were presided over by Liza Minnelli, Dudley Moore, Richard Pryor, and Walter Matthau. Louis Gossett Jr. became the first African-American actor to win Best Supporting Actor for his performance as the tough and principled drill instructor Emil Foley in An Officer and a Gentleman. Bhanu Athaiya also became the first Indian to win an Academy Award for Best Costume Design for Gandhi. This marked the first of 28 consecutive years where a Barbara Walters interview special aired before the ceremony. Walters had previously aired an interview special in 1981 and, in subsequent years, her special aired prior to the Academy's formal broadcast of celebrities walking the red carpet. It was also the only time George C. Scott attended an Oscars ceremony.

Gandhi won eight awards, including Best Picture and Best Actor. Other winners included E.T. the Extra-Terrestrial with four awards, An Officer and a Gentleman with two, Begin the Beguine, If You Love This Planet, Just Another Missing Kid, Missing, Quest for Fire, A Shocking Accident, Sophie's Choice, Tango, Tootsie, and Victor/Victoria with one.

Awards

Nominations were announced on February 17, 1983. Winners are listed first, highlighted in boldface, and indicated with a double dagger.

Honorary Academy Award
 Mickey Rooney

Jean Hersholt Humanitarian Award
 Walter Mirisch

Presenters and performers
The following individuals, listed in order of appearance, presented awards or performed musical numbers.

Presenters

Performers

Multiple nominations and awards

These films had multiple nominations:
11 nominations: Gandhi
10 nominations: Tootsie
9 nominations: E.T. the Extra-Terrestrial
7 nominations: Victor/Victoria
6 nominations: Das Boot and An Officer and a Gentleman
5 nominations: Sophie's Choice and The Verdict
4 nominations: Missing
3 nominations: Poltergeist
2 nominations: Annie, Blade Runner, Frances, La Traviata, Tron and The World According to Garp 

The following films received multiple awards.
8 wins: Gandhi
4 wins: E.T. the Extra-Terrestrial
2 wins: An Officer and a Gentleman

See also
 40th Golden Globe Awards
 3rd Golden Raspberry Awards
 1982 in film
 Submissions for the 55th Academy Award for Best Foreign Film
 25th Grammy Awards
 34th Primetime Emmy Awards
 35th Primetime Emmy Awards
 36th British Academy Film Awards
 37th Tony Awards

References

Academy Awards ceremonies
1982 film awards
1983 in Los Angeles
1983 in American cinema
April 1983 events in the United States
Academy
Television shows directed by Marty Pasetta